Alfred Hilborn Bates (April 24, 1905 – June 9, 1999) was an American athlete who competed mainly in the long jump.

He competed in the long jump for the United States in the 1928 Summer Olympics held in Amsterdam, Netherlands, winning the bronze medal.

See also
List of Pennsylvania State University Olympians

External links 
 

1905 births
1999 deaths
Athletes (track and field) at the 1928 Summer Olympics
American male long jumpers
Olympic bronze medalists for the United States in track and field
Medalists at the 1928 Summer Olympics